UDTS may mean:

 Union Démocratique des Travailleurs de Sénégal, the Democratic Union of Senegalese Workers
 Uppsala-DLR Trojan Survey